The Grand Union Camera Obscura was built during the 1890s and is located on Douglas Head near the Lighthouse. The building is a tourist attraction that offers a unique view of its surroundings. Using several lenses and mirrors, it reflects a unified, panoramic view of the surrounding area that is split into small digestible scenes and projected onto large white screens within the dark confines of the building. This optical effect is achieved by the apparatus known as camera obscura.

History 
Once a private undertaking and having ceased to operate in the early 1990s, the Grand Union Camera Obscura became the property of the Manx National Heritage, which placed a protective casing around its Victorian structure.  The Grand Union Camera Obscura later underwent an extensive refurbishment and the attraction is now open in the summer months, operated by volunteers. It is a prominent and distinctive landmark when viewed from the arriving ferries of the Isle of Man Steam Packet.

See also
 Douglas Head
 Douglas Head Amphitheatre
 Douglas Head Funicular Railway

References 

Buildings and structures in the Isle of Man
Camera obscuras
Tourist attractions in the Isle of Man
Registered Buildings of the Isle of Man